The Morehead State Eagles men's basketball team is the basketball team that represents Morehead State University in Morehead, Kentucky, United States.  The school's team currently competes in the Ohio Valley Conference.

Postseason results

NCAA tournament results
The Eagles have appeared in eight NCAA Tournaments. Their combined record is 6–9.

NIT results 
The Eagles have appeared in the National Invitation Tournament one time. Their combined record is 1–1.

CBI results
The Eagles have appeared in three College Basketball Invitational (CBI). Their combined record is 5–4.

NAIA
The Eagles have appeared in the NAIA Basketball Tournament once, their record is 0–1.

Eagles in international leagues
Karam Mashour (born 1991), plays in the Israeli Basketball Premier League.

References

External links